Jaswant Singh Kanwal (27 June 1919 – 1 February 2020) was an Indian novelist, short story writer and essayist of the Punjabi language. He was born in the village of Dhudike, Moga District, Punjab, India. As a young teenager he left school and went to Malaya. It was there that he first got interested in literature. He returned to Dhudike after a few years and has lived there ever since. He was awarded the Punjabi Sahit Shiromani Award in the year 2007.

Writings
He published several books. His novels usually have a rustic feel and depict the rural life of Punjab very vividly. His writings generally question firmly held social customs and beliefs. He has left leanings and many of his most popular novels champion the cause of socially relevant issues like social and gender equality. He is also known to take tough political stands in his newspaper essays. Later on, he became a supporter of the Khalistan movement.

His most notable novel is Lahoo Di Lo (Dawn of the Blood). This novel is based on the Naxalite movement in Punjab. It was very controversial during the infamous Emergency days of the 1970s and none of the publishers was willing to publish it. Jaswant Singh Kanwal had it published in Singapore and smuggled copies of the novel to India. Only after the emergency was lifted, was the novel published in Punjab. This book has been translated into English.

Awards
Jaswant Singh Kanwal was awarded Sahitya Akademi Fellowship for his 1996 book Pakhi (Hand Fan) (Short stories). He received the Sahitya Academy award for Taushali Di Hanso (Novel) in 1998.

Jaswant Singh Kanwal was conferred upon the degree of Doctor of Literature (Honoris Causa) by Guru Nanak Dev University, Amritsar in 2008 for his contribution to Punjabi literature.

Bibliography

 Punjabio Marna Hai Ke Jina (O Punjabi! Do you wish to die or live?)
Khoon Ke Sohile Gavee-aih Nanak (Nanak! Sing Sonnets of Blood)(Two volumes) Novel
Mukati Maarag (Freedom Way) Novel
Lahu Di Lo (Dawn of the Blood)
Haani (Soul-mate)
Roop Dhaara (Layers of Beauty)
Manukhata  (Humanity)
Morha (The Turn)
Civil Lines
Jera (Guts)
Jungle De Sher (Tigers of the Jungle)
Raat Baaki Hai (The Night is Unfinished)
Puranmaashi (Full Moon Night)
Mittar Piyaare Nu (To Friend Beloved)
Gora Mukh Sajna Da (Handsome is the face of friend)
Pali
Sach Nu Phansi (Death to the Truth)
Rooh Da Haan (Friendship with the Soul)
Dev Dass
Chikar De Kanwal (Lotuses of Mud)
Zindagi Door Nahin (Life is not Afar)
Kande (Thorns)
Sandhoor (Colour of Marriage)
Hal Muridan Da (Tale of a Disciple) (Political Diary)
Apna Quami Ghar (Our National Home Land)
Ainion Chon Utho Surma (From the Masses Will Rise the Valorous)
Jittnama (Tale of Victory)
Juhu Da Moti
Navan Sanias
Sundraan
Soormain
Barf Di Agg
Aradhna (worship)
Hawka Te Muskaan
Bhavana
Jeevan Kahanian (Stories of Life)
Sikh Jaddo Jehad (Sikh Struggle)
Ainian Chon Utho Soorma'Maran mitran de ageLamme Walan Di PeerJand Panjab daGwachi Pug (Lost honour)Tarikh vekhdi hai (Time is a Witness)Taushali di hansoAhesasRoopmati''

References

External links

Signature of Jaswant Singh Kanwal |website=Official Website of Deep Datewas |access-date=2015-10-08
Biography (Punjabi)

1919 births
2020 deaths
Indian centenarians
Indian male novelists
People from Moga, Punjab
Indian Sikhs
Recipients of the Sahitya Akademi Award in Punjabi
Recipients of the Sahitya Akademi Fellowship
Punjabi-language writers
Punjabi people
20th-century Indian novelists
Novelists from Punjab, India
People from Moga district
20th-century Indian short story writers
20th-century Indian essayists
Journalists from Punjab, India
20th-century Indian male writers
Men centenarians